Tarane     is a Lebanese Sunni Muslim village, located in the Miniyeh-Danniyeh District. It had 1,593 eligible voters in the 2009 elections.

History
In 1838, Eli Smith noted  the village as Taran,  whose inhabitants were Sunni Muslim, located in the Ed-Dunniyeh area.

References

Bibliography

External links
Tarane, Localiban

Populated places in Miniyeh-Danniyeh District
Populated places in Lebanon
Sunni Muslim communities in Lebanon